Peter Michael Manley (born February 14, 1942, in Wausau, Wisconsin) is a retired middle- and long-distance runner from the United States. He twice won the gold medal in the men's 3.000 metres steeplechase event at the Pan American Games: 1971 and 1975.

Manley represented his native country at the 1972 Summer Olympics  in Munich, West Germany.  He was the 1969 AAU steeplechase champion while competing for the Southern California Striders and competed for the University of Wisconsin–Madison and the Oregon Track Club.

Personal Bests
Mile – 4:01.4 (1974)
2 miles – 8:34.8 (1972)
Steeplechase – 8:27.6 (1971)
5,000 metres – 13:42.4 (1976).
10,000 metres – 29:10.0 (1976).
Marathon – 2:14:43 (1980)

References

1942 births
Living people
American male middle-distance runners
American male long-distance runners
American male steeplechase runners
Athletes (track and field) at the 1971 Pan American Games
Athletes (track and field) at the 1975 Pan American Games
Athletes (track and field) at the 1972 Summer Olympics
Olympic track and field athletes of the United States
Sportspeople from Wausau, Wisconsin
Track and field athletes from Wisconsin
University of Wisconsin–Madison alumni
Pan American Games gold medalists for the United States
Pan American Games medalists in athletics (track and field)
American masters athletes
Medalists at the 1971 Pan American Games
Medalists at the 1975 Pan American Games
20th-century American people